Zoran Kokot (Serbian Cyrillic: Зоран Кокот; born June 28, 1985) is a Bosnian footballer who plays as a forward for FK Famos Vojkovići.

Career

Early career
Kokot began his career in 2004 with FK Slavija in the Bosnian Premier League. In 2007, he played abroad in the Ontario Soccer League with the Hamilton Serbians, where he finished as the top goalscorer in the Provincial West Division. Shortly after he signed with the Serbian White Eagles FC in the Canadian Soccer League, where he assisted in securing the International Division title.

Abroad 
After a season abroad he returned to FK Slavija and later played in the Belgian Second Division with KSK Beveren. In May 2011, he signed with Mes Sarcheshme in the Azadegan League. The following season he played with Gol Gohar Sirjan F.C.

Bosnia 
In 2012, he returned to FK Slavija and later played with FK Olimpik. He played the first part of the 2014-15 season with Slavija. In February 2015, he signed a one-year contract with FK Željezničar Sarajevo. Throughout his tenure with Željezničar he played in the 2015–16 UEFA Europa League against Balzan F.C., Ferencvárosi TC, and Standard Liège. He left Željezničar on mutual terms in December 2015. After that he had another stint abroad, this time in the Montenegrin First League with Mladost Podgorica, where he assisted in securing the league title.

The following season he returned home to sign a one-year contract with NK Vitez. In 2017, he played in the First League of the Federation of Bosnia and Herzegovina with NK Zvijezda Gradačac. The remainder of the season he played with NK Travnik. He returned to his former club FK Slavija the following season to play in the First League of the Republika Srpska, and retired in 2019.

Later career 
In 2020, he came out of retirement to play once more in the Canadian Soccer League with Hamilton City SC. He made his debut for Hamilton on August 15, 2020, against his former team the Serbian White Eagles, and recorded a goal. Following his brief stint in Canada, he returned to Bosnia to further in career by playing in the Second League of the Republika Srpska with Famos Vojkovići in 2021. In his debut season with Famos, the club secured promotion to the second tier.

International career 
In December 2010, Bosnian national team coach Safet Sušić called him up for a friendly (the Bosnian team being comprised almost exclusively of domestic league players) against Poland.

Honours
Serbian White Eagles
 Canadian Soccer League International Division: 2007

Mladost Podgorica
 Montenegrin First League: 2015–16

References

External links
 Profile at Soccerway

1985 births
Living people
Footballers from Sarajevo
Serbs of Bosnia and Herzegovina
Association football forwards
Bosnia and Herzegovina footballers
FK Slavija Sarajevo players
Serbian White Eagles FC players
K.S.K. Beveren players
Mes Sarcheshme players
Gol Gohar players
FK Olimpik players
FK Željezničar Sarajevo players
OFK Titograd players
NK Vitez players
NK Zvijezda Gradačac players
NK Travnik players
Hamilton City SC players 
FK Famos Vojkovići players
Premier League of Bosnia and Herzegovina players
Canadian Soccer League (1998–present) players
Challenger Pro League players
Azadegan League players
Montenegrin First League players
First League of the Federation of Bosnia and Herzegovina players
First League of the Republika Srpska players 
Bosnia and Herzegovina expatriate footballers
Expatriate soccer players in Canada
Bosnia and Herzegovina expatriate sportspeople in Canada
Expatriate footballers in Belgium
Bosnia and Herzegovina expatriate sportspeople in Belgium
Expatriate footballers in Iran
Bosnia and Herzegovina expatriate sportspeople in Iran
Expatriate footballers in North Macedonia
Bosnia and Herzegovina expatriate sportspeople in North Macedonia